A streamlined motorcycle is a motorcycle with a fairing that goes beyond a 'full' or 'dustbin' fairing, to form an aerodynamic shell to minimize drag. This helps attaining higher top speeds, as in the motorcycle land-speed record, or increased energy efficiency, as in the Craig Vetter Fuel Economy Challenge.  Often they are feet forwards motorcycles or have the rider in a prone position, rather than upright, to reduce the frontal area exposed to headwind.

See also 
Motorcycle land-speed record
BUB Seven Streamliner

References

External links 

 Official Ack Attack page